"Glorious" is a single by Los Angeles-based band The Pierces. It is the second single released from their fourth studio album, You & I. It was released on 10 April 2011 as a Digital download. The song is a cover originally sung by US indie-pop/rock musician James Levy, who is also credited for playing guitar on The Pierces' version.

Music video 
The music video was uploaded to YouTube on April 21, 2011.

Track listings
Digital download #1
 "Glorious" - 3:44

Digital download #2
 "Glorious" - 3:44
 "City On Fire" - 3:15

Chart performance

Release history

References 

2011 singles
2011 songs
Polydor Records singles